Events from the year 1508 in India.

Events
 The Christian-Islamic power struggle in Europe and the Middle East spills over into the Indian Ocean as Battle of Chaul during the Portuguese-Mamluk War

Births
 7 March – Humayun (Nasir ud-din Muhammad Humayun), later Mughal emperor (died 1556)

Deaths
 March, Lourenço de Almeida Portuguese explorer and military commander dies in the Battle of Chaul (born c 1480)
 Mayimama Marakkar, Indian ambassador of the Zamorin ruler of Calicut dies at the Battle of Chaul

See also
 Timeline of Indian history

References